Bernardo Martínez Jacques (born 21 August 1972) is a Mexican former professional tennis player.

Martínez, a native of Mexico City, competed on the professional tour as a doubles specialist, reaching a best ranking of 128 in the world. He won two doubles titles on the ATP Challenger Tour.

Between 1992 and 1995, Martínez played collegiate tennis for Texas A&M, forming a successful doubles partnership with Mark Weaver. The pair were the 1994 Southwest Conference No. 1 doubles champions.

Martínez has been married to Mexican soap actress Luz Elena González since 2009.

Challenger titles

Doubles: (2)

References

External links
 
 

1972 births
Living people
Mexican male tennis players
Texas A&M Aggies men's tennis players
Tennis players from Mexico City